The 1938 United States House of Representatives elections in South Carolina were held on November 8, 1938, to select six Representatives for two-year terms from the state of South Carolina.  The primary elections were held on August 30 and the runoff elections were held two weeks later on September 13.  Three incumbents were re-elected, but two incumbents were defeated in the Democratic primary.  The three open seats were retained by the Democrats and the composition of the state delegation thus remained solely Democratic.

1st congressional district
Incumbent Democratic Congressman Thomas S. McMillan of the 1st congressional district, in office since 1925, defeated A. Russell McGowan in the Democratic primary and Republican B.L. Hendrix in the general election.

Democratic primary

General election results

|-
| 
| colspan=5 |Democratic hold
|-

2nd congressional district
Incumbent Democratic Congressman Hampton P. Fulmer of the 2nd congressional district, in office since 1921, defeated former Lieutenant Governor Andrew J. Bethea in the Democratic primary and Republican S.J. Leaphart in the general election.

Democratic primary

General election results

|-
| 
| colspan=5 |Democratic hold
|-

3rd congressional district
Incumbent Democratic Congressman John C. Taylor of the 3rd congressional district, in office since 1933, was defeated in the Democratic primary by Butler B. Hare who defeated Republican O.B. Menees in the general election.

Democratic primary

General election results

|-
| 
| colspan=5 |Democratic hold
|-

4th congressional district
Incumbent Democratic Congressman Gabriel H. Mahon, Jr. of the 4th congressional district, in office since 1937, was defeated in the Democratic primary by Joseph R. Bryson who defeated Republican H.A. Costner in the general election.  The first primary had the two candidates only separated by 8 votes so the South Carolina Democratic Party Executive Committee ordered a new race instead of a recount, which Bryson clearly won.

Democratic primary

General election results

|-
| 
| colspan=5 |Democratic hold
|-

5th congressional district
Incumbent Democratic Congressman James P. Richards of the 5th congressional district, in office since 1933, defeated Republican challenger A.B. McCraw.

General election results

|-
| 
| colspan=5 |Democratic hold
|-

6th congressional district
Incumbent Democratic Congresswoman Elizabeth Hawley Gasque of the 6th congressional district succeeded her husband, Allard H. Gasque, in office upon his death in 1938 and she did not seek re-election.  John L. McMillan won the Democratic primary and defeated Republican W.S. Thompson in the general election.

Democratic primary

General election results

|-
| 
| colspan=5 |Democratic hold
|-

See also
1938 United States House of Representatives elections
1938 United States Senate election in South Carolina
1938 South Carolina gubernatorial election
South Carolina's congressional districts

References

"Supplemental Report of the Secretary of State to the General Assembly of South Carolina." Report of the State Officers Boards and Committees to the General Assembly of the State of South Carolina. Volume I. Columbia, SC: 1939, pp. 7–9.

South Carolina
1938
1938 South Carolina elections